Helmet Peak may refer to:

 Helmet Peak (Antarctica) (Livingston Island)
 Helmet Peak (British Columbia)

See also
 The Helmet (mountain), a mountain in Montana